Bulls Head is a neighborhood in west-central Staten Island, one of the five boroughs of New York City. It is bordered by New Springville to the south, Bloomfield to the west, Willowbrook to the east, Graniteville to the north, and Westerleigh to the north.

The community received its name from an 18th-century tavern located at the intersection of Victory Boulevard and Richmond Avenue (the neighborhood's central point), from which a sign bearing a bull's head was displayed. The Bulls Head area was also known as Phoenixville. During the American Revolution, this tavern became the local headquarters of the faction loyal to the British crown, or Tories, as they were colloquially known. As recently as the early 1960s, Bulls Head and the surrounding neighborhoods, such as Willowbrook to the east and Graniteville to the north, were dominated by farmland. Dramatic change came soon after the Verrazano-Narrows Bridge opened in 1964, opening up the area to residential development. Soon many Jewish families, mostly from the boroughs of Brooklyn and Queens, settled in Bulls Head and other west mid-island neighborhoods. A smaller number of Asian immigrants live in Bulls Head. Many of the residents are Italian Catholics served by Our Lady of Pity R.C. Church. 

Bulls Head's schools are the elementary school P.S. 60 and the intermediate school I.S. 72. Most of the residents are zoned for Port Richmond High School. The Todt Hill Library is nearby, at 2550 Victory Boulevard.

Bulls Head is served by the  local buses and the SIM4, SIM4C, SIM8, SIM8X, SIM32 and SIM33 express buses.

As of the 2010 census, the demographics of Bulls Head were roughly 71.2% White, 2.3% Black, 15% Hispanic, 9.8% Asian, and 1.7% Other. This is defining Bulls Head as everything within the boundaries of Census Tracts 291.03, and 291.04, as well as the blocks north of Willowbrook Park in Tract 273.01.

Notable people
People who were born in, residents of, or otherwise closely associated with Bulls Head include:

 Jennifer Esposito (born 1976), actress
 Matthew Festa (born 1993), MLB pitcher for the Seattle Mariners

References

Neighborhoods in Staten Island